Identification is the debut studio album by Swedish singer and songwriter Benjamin Ingrosso. It was released on September 28, 2018, by TEN Music Group. The album received favourable reviews from critics.

A deluxe edition of the album was released in February 2019, featuring three new tracks including "Tror du att han bryr sig".

Critical reception

Identification received positive reviews from music critics.

Track listing

Charts

Weekly charts

Year-end charts

Certifications

References

2018 debut albums
Benjamin Ingrosso albums
TEN Music Group albums